Morphological analysis was designed for multi-dimensional, non-quantifiable problems where causal modeling and simulation do not function well or at all. Fritz Zwicky developed this approach to seemingly non-reducible complexity (Zwicky, 1966, 1969). Using the technique of cross consistency assessment (CCA) (Ritchey, 2002), the system however does allow for reduction, not by reducing the number of variables involved, but by reducing the number of possible solutions through the elimination of the illogical solution combinations in a grid box.

References in fiction 

Robert A. Heinlein has his characters use a "Zwicky box" in Time Enough for Love, to figure out what's available to break the ennui of his 2000-year-old character.

David Brin used "Zwicky Choice Boxes" in Sundiver as a means to help solve a murder mystery.

References 

 Ritchey, Tom (2002). General Morphological Analysis: A general method for non-quantified modeling.
 Zwicky, F., Discovery, Invention, Research - Through the Morphological Approach, Toronto: The Macmillan Company (1969). 
 Zwicky, F. & Wilson A. (eds.), New Methods of Thought and Procedure: Contributions to the Symposium on Methodologies. Berlin: Springer (1967).

Problem solving